Albin Vidović (11 February 1943 – 8 March 2018) was a Croatian handball player who competed in the 1972 Summer Olympics.

He was part of the Yugoslav team which won the gold medal. He played one match.

Honours
Partizan Bjelovar
Yugoslav First League (6): 1960–61, 1966–67, 1967–68, 1969–70, 1970–71, 1971–72
Yugoslav Cup (1): 1968
European Champions Cup (1): 1971-72

External links
 
 Albin Vidović died

1943 births
2018 deaths
Sportspeople from Zagreb
Yugoslav male handball players
Croatian male handball players
Olympic handball players of Yugoslavia
Handball players at the 1972 Summer Olympics
Olympic gold medalists for Yugoslavia
Olympic medalists in handball
Medalists at the 1972 Summer Olympics
Mediterranean Games gold medalists for Yugoslavia
Competitors at the 1967 Mediterranean Games
Mediterranean Games medalists in handball